Malik Henry (born April 16, 1997) is an American gridiron football wide receiver for the Calgary Stampeders of the Canadian Football League (CFL). He played college football at West Georgia. In the NFL, Henry has also been a member of the San Francisco 49ers, Indianapolis Colts and New Orleans Saints.

College career
Henry began his collegiate career at Georgia Southern, where he played in 29 games over three years (2015–17) and made 23 catches for 344 yards and one touchdown. Henry also accumulated 382 yards on 18 kickoff returns. Following his junior season, he transferred to West Georgia. Henry played his senior season (2018) at West Georgia and led the Wolves with seven receiving touchdowns. He was second on the team in both catches (30) and receiving yards (407).

Professional career

San Francisco 49ers
After going undrafted in the 2019 NFL Draft, Henry was signed by the San Francisco 49ers as an undrafted free agent on May 3, 2019. He was waived on August 31, 2019, and was signed to the practice squad the next day. He was released on October 16, 2019.

Indianapolis Colts
On December 3, 2019, Henry was signed to the Indianapolis Colts practice squad. He signed a reserve/future contract with the Colts on December 30, 2019. Henry was placed on the reserve/COVID-19 list by the Colts on July 27, 2020. He was activated from the list and subsequently waived on August 12, 2020.

New Orleans Saints
On September 30, 2020, Henry was signed to the New Orleans Saints practice squad. He was released on October 10, 2020.

Calgary Stampeders
Henry signed with the Calgary Stampeders of the CFL on January 25, 2021. In his first season with the club, he played in nine games and caught 11 passes for 124 yards with two touchdowns. Henry's second year in the CFL would prove to be a breakout season, as he played in 13 games and recorded 62 receptions for 1,023 yards and eight touchdowns and was rewarded with a contract extension on October 5, 2022.

References

External links
San Francisco 49ers bio
West Georgia Wolves bio
Calgary Stampeders bio

1997 births
Living people
People from Tifton, Georgia
African-American players of American football
American football wide receivers
Players of American football from Georgia (U.S. state)
Georgia Southern Eagles football players
West Georgia Wolves football players
San Francisco 49ers players
Indianapolis Colts players
New Orleans Saints players
Calgary Stampeders players
21st-century African-American sportspeople